"N-R-G" is the debut single by British acid house DJ and producer Adamski, released in late 1989. The song charted well in both the UK and U.S., peaking at No. 12 on the UK Singles Chart on 21 January 1990, and at No. 13 on the Billboard Hot Dance Club Play chart in May 1990. The song first appeared on his 1989 live album Liveandirect, then as an extended version on his debut studio album Doctor Adamski's Musical Pharmacy the following year.

The single's cover featured a mocked up Lucozade bottle with the name "Lucozade" replaced with "Adamski", and the word "Energy" replaced with "N-R-G". The company had threatened to sue due to the use of the bottle without permission.

Charts

References

1989 songs
1990 debut singles
Adamski songs
MCA Records singles